Polvision is a Polish-language television station broadcasting in Chicago. Established in 1987, it is targeted towards the Chicago Polonia. From its inception Polvision was and still remains the only Polish language television program available free to the public, currently on the open digital channel 24.4 and Comcast 397, for the Polish Americans in the Chicago area.

Polvision broadcasts 24 hours a day from one of the tallest residential building in Chicago. The program is distributed via terrestrial transmitters in Chicago on the 24.4 digital channel as well as in the Comcast cable network on channel 397. In March 2008, Polvision, as one of the first ethnic television stations, abandoned analogue terrestrial broadcasting for digital broadcasting. Since then, TV Polvision has been broadcasting its program on channel 24.4 only. The terrestrial range of the station includes part of the city of Chicago and the closest suburbs. Its first editor-in-chief was Maciej Wierzyński, later editor-in-chief of New York's Nowy Dziennik.

The founder and owner of Polvision is the Polish businessman Walter Kotaba, who is also the owner of Polnet Communications Ltd, which includes the largest Polish Radio network in the US, with stations in IL and NY/NJ as well as other ethnic radio programs (Russian, Korean, Italian, Greek, etc.)

External links
 

Television networks in the United States
Television channels and stations established in 1989
Television stations in Chicago
Polish-language mass media in the United States
Polish-language television stations